The year 1939 saw a number of significant events in radio broadcasting.


Events
1 April – The rumor that Hitler is dead sweeps the United States, as millions of CBS radio listeners hear the Führer cut off in mid-speech during a shortwave relay of his address at the dedication of the German battleship Tirpitz in Wilhelmshaven. 
17 June – A trans-Atlantic radio broadcast features coloratura soprano Ewa Bandrowska-Turska singing four songs by Karol Szymanowski from Wawel Castle in Krakow, Poland, for a United States audience on WENR.
15 July – Inauguration of DZRH, one of the oldest radio stations in the Philippines.
29 July – In France, with war on the horizon, a package of decrees tightens the state's control of public radio and obliges all private stations to broadcast, unedited, the government's Radio-Journal in place of their own news programmes.
7 August – Official test transmissions begin from Radio Andorra. The station is ceremonially inaugurated two days later by the French Minister of Public Works, Anatole de Monzie.
September – The French government's radio for schools initiative ends until 1946.
1 September – At 18.55 local time BBC engineers receive the order to begin closing down all UK transmitters in preparation for wartime broadcasting: this marks the end of the National and Regional Programmes of the BBC. At 20.15 local time the BBC's Home Service begins transmission: this will be the corporation's only domestic radio channel for the first four months of World War II.
3 September
Fireside chat by the President of the United States: On the European War.
Neville Chamberlain, Prime Minister of the United Kingdom, speaking from 10 Downing Street, announces on the BBC at 11.15 local time (10.15 GMT) that "this country is at war with Germany".
19 September – Popular British radio comedy show It's That Man Again with Tommy Handley is first broadcast on the BBC Home service, following trial broadcasts from 12 July. Known as "ITMA", and also featuring Jack Train  and many others, it runs for ten years;  the performers have initially been evacuated to Bristol.
17 November – Radio station ZQI begins broadcasting in Jamaica, initially for an hour a week.
11 December – Havana, Cuba's CMQ (from 1959, state-owned Radio Rebelde) becomes the first affiliate for the NBC Red Network based outside of the United States and Canada.
12 December – James M. Cox gains control of WSB and a 40 percent interest in WAGA, both in Atlanta, Georgia.
22 December – KORN begins broadcasting in Fremont, Nebraska, on 1370 kHz.
25 December 
In his Christmas broadcast on BBC radio, King George VI of the United Kingdom quotes Minnie Louise Haskins' poem "The Gate of the Year".
Charles Dickens's A Christmas Carol is read for the first time on American radio (CBS).

Debuts

Programs
14 January – Honolulu Bound debuts on CBS.  
16 January – I Love a Mystery debuts on west coast NBC stations.  
21 January – Brenthouse debuts on the Blue Network.  
23 January – Doc Barclay's Daughters debuts on CBS. 
13 February – The Carters of Elm Street debuts on NBC. 
19 February – Norman Corwin's radio series Words Without Music is premiered on the CBS Radio Network.
25 March – Arch Oboler's Plays debuts on NBC. 
3 April – Mr. District Attorney (1939–1952) debuts on NBC.
7 April – Author, Author debuts on Mutual. 
29 May – The Affairs of Anthony debuts on the Blue Network. 
29 May – When a Girl Marries debuts on CBS.
5 June – Caroline's Golden Store debuts on NBC. 
18 June – The Adventures of Ellery Queen (1939–1948) debuts on CBS.
2 July – The Aldrich Family debuts on NBC. 
3 July – Blondie debuts on CBS.   
4 July – Alec Templeton Time debuts on NBC. 
12 July – It's That Man Again debuts on the BBC Home Service.
6 August – The Dinah Shore Show debuts on the Blue Network. 
3 September – Let the People Sing by J. B. Priestley, written for radio and read by the author.
11 September – Brenda Curtis debuts on CBS. 
25 September – Singing Together debuts on BBC Radio schools service (1939–2001).
7 October – Art for Your Sake debuts on NBC. 
9 October – By Kathleen Norris debuts on CBS. 
16 October – Against the Storm debuts on NBC.
17 October – Captain Midnight debuts on WGN. 
19 October – Don Winslow of the Navy debuts on the Blue Network. 
25 December – The Bartons debuts on the Blue Network.

Stations
 28 July – KVAK, Atchison, Kansas, begins broadcasting on 1420 kHz with 100 W power (daytime only).
25 December – The Bartons debuts on the Blue Network.
December – WCAR, Pontiac, Michigan, begins broadcasting on 1100 kHz with 1 KW power (daytime only).

Endings
27 February – Alias Jimmy Valentine ends its run on network radio (Blue Network in the US). 
7 May – Americans All, Immigrants All ends its run on network radio (CBS). 
30 June
 Central City ends its run on network radio (NBC Red). 
 Howie Wing ends its run on network radio (CBS). 
28 July – Her Honor, Nancy James ends its run on network radio (CBS). 
7 September – Radio Normandy signs off for the last time.
8 September – Calling All Cars ends its run on network radio (CBS West Coast network).

Births
23 January – Vincent Duggleby, English personal finance radio presenter.
3 March – Larry Burkett (died 2003), American evangelical Christian author and radio personality.
4 March – Keith Skues, English radio presenter.
19 March – Bob Kingsley (died 2019), American country music personality.
7 May – David Hatch (died 2007), English radio executive and performer.
30 August – John Peel, born John Ravenscroft (died 2004), English DJ.
19 September – Louise Botting, English radio presenter and businesswoman.
18 December – Alex Bennett, born Bennett Schwarzmann, American talk show host.

Deaths
9 March – Ernie Hare, American singer, known for The Happiness Boys'', 55
16 June – Chick Webb, American jazz drummer, 34
20 July – Sir Dan Godfrey, English conductor, 71
6 December – Charles Dalmorès, French tenor, 68
19 December – Eric Fogg, English composer and conductor, 36 (killed by Underground train)

References

 
Radio by year